The northern three-striped opossum (Monodelphis americana) is an opossum species from South America.

It is endemic to Atlantic Forest ecoregions of coastal Brazil.

References 

Opossums
Endemic fauna of Brazil
Fauna of the Atlantic Forest
Mammals of Brazil
Marsupials of South America
Environment of Bahia
Environment of Espírito Santo
Environment of Rio de Janeiro (state)
Environment of São Paulo (state)
Mammals described in 1776
Taxa named by Philipp Ludwig Statius Müller